Karol Łazarz Henckel von Donnersmarck (March 5, 1772 – July 12, 1864) was a German businessman who, among other things, founded the mines  founding amongst others the mines of Katowice, which now house the Silesian Museum.

Life 
Karol Henckel von Donnersmarck was a member of the Henckel von Donnersmarck Austro-German noble family. Donnersmarck was the youngest son of Baron Erdmann Gustaw von Donnersmarck and Barroness Rudolphina von Dyherrn.

Karol was married to Countess Julia von Bohlen. Among his children was Guido Henckel von Donnersmarck (1830-1916), who would become a prince and industrial magnate.

Early career 
During the Napoleonic Wars, Henckel founded and led a regiment of Silesian hussars. 

Following the death of his brother Gustav Adolf in 1813, Henckel inherited the family estate in Świerklaniec.

Honors and awards 
He was awarded the Order of Pour le Mérite and the highest Prussian Order of the Black Eagle with Diamonds. He was the Commander and Senior of the Order of St. John (Protestant equivalent of the Order of Malta). In 1840 he became a hereditary national senior grandfather in the Duchy of Silesia with the title of "Excellency". As a free statesman, he was a member of the Prussian House of Lords.

References

1772 births
1864 deaths
German mining businesspeople
Carl Lazarus
Members of the Prussian House of Lords
People from Bytom
Recipients of the Pour le Mérite (military class)
Tarnowskie Góry County
People from the Province of Silesia